Ouest-France (French for "West-France") is a daily French newspaper known for its emphasis on both local and national news. The paper is produced in 47 different editions covering events in different French départments within the régions of Brittany, Lower Normandy and Pays de la Loire. Its readership has been unaffected by the decline of newspaper reading in France, unlike most other dailies.

With 2.5 million daily readers (and a circulation of almost 800 000 units), it is by far the most read francophone newspaper in the world, ahead of French national newspapers Le Figaro and Le Monde.

History
 
Ouest-France was founded in 1944 by Adolphe Le Goaziou and others following the closure of Ouest-Éclair, which was banned by Liberation forces for collaborationism during the war. It is based in Rennes and Nantes and has a circulation about 792,400 (greater than any French national daily newspaper), mostly in Brittany.

Its editorial line has been strongly pro-European integration from the beginning, influenced by Christian democracy (Popular Republican Movement), now MoDem, Nouveau Centre or Union for a Popular Movement (UMP). With 2.52 million readers, Ouest-France is also the leading French-language daily in the world.

The paper had a circulation of 773,471 copies in 2001 and 764,731 copies in 2002 with a market share of 14.41%. The paper had a circulation of 637,463 copies in 2020.

The distinct editions
The 47 different editions are divided among twelve départements :

See also
 List of French newspapers

References

External links
 Ouest-France website

1944 establishments in France
Daily newspapers published in France
Mass media in Rennes
Publications established in 1944